Nannopterix choreutes is a moth of the family Micropterigidae. It is known from New Caledonia, from the Table Unio south to Rivière Bleue.

The forewing length is 2.4 mm for males. The forewing ground colour is uniform. There is a narrow brown costal streak and another slightly broader brown anal streak. Furthermore, a small
brown patch of scales and an irregular area of brown scales in the apex. The fringes are ochreous except for a tuft of brown scales. The hindwing is pale ochreous with ochreous fringes.

Etymology
The species name is derived from the Greek choreutai (the dancers who took part in a troupe of singers or dancers) and refers to the graceful flying behaviour of this tiny golden moth, as it flits around on the forest floor, amongst the dead leaves.

References

Micropterigidae
Moths described in 2010